Dominic "Dick" Patrick was a Canadian war hero and prominent activist for Indian civil rights.
A Carrier Indian, he was born in 1920 in Saik'uz village in British Columbia and lived most of his life there.
In early 1942 he enlisted in the Canadian army. He served in the Canadian 4th Armoured Division with the rank of Gunner
as a member of the crew of an M10 tank destroyer.

On September 10, 1944 during the Battle of Moerbrugge near Moerbrugge,Belgium, his unit was having difficulty locating enemy positions. Patrick went ahead alone to reconnoiter, encountered an enemy machine gun nest, attacked it, and singlehandedly captured 55 German soldiers. For this action he received the Military Medal from King George VI on October 23, 1945 at Buckingham Palace. The citation reads:

He used the opportunity to tell the King of the discrimination that he and his people experienced.

While in the Army Patrick was treated as an equal, with little discrimination, but after his discharge in March 1946 he faced the same discrimination as before. In Vanderhoof, the town nearest to his village, Indians were refused service by many businesses and required to use separate entrances and facilities by others. Shortly after his return, he entered the Silver Grill Café, took a seat, and attempted to order a meal. When he was denied service, he refused to leave. For this he was arrested, charged with disturbing the peace,
and sentenced to six months in prison. He served his time in Oakalla Prison,
which was notorious for its brutal and inhumane conditions.

When he was released and returned to Vanderhoof, he immediately went back to
the Silver Grill Café and again demanded service. He was again arrested and sent to prison. Over the course of a year he demanded to be served 11 times and was imprisoned 11 times. He spent 11 months of the year in prison. 

Dick Patrick died in 1980 and was buried, with full military honors, in Saik'uz village.

References

Canadian recipients of the Military Medal
Dakelh people
1920 births
1980 deaths
Indigenous leaders in British Columbia
20th-century First Nations people
Canadian military personnel of World War II